Standard Korean Language Dictionary is a dictionary of the Korean language, published by the National Institute of Korean Language.

History 
The compilation of Standard Korean Language Dictionary was commenced on 1 January 1992, by The National Academy of the Korean Language, the predecessor of the National Institute of Korean Language. The dictionary's first edition was published in three volumes on 9 October 1999, followed by the compact disc released on 9 October 2001. The online dictionary was launched on 9 October 2002, and revised on 9 October 2008.

See also 
 Basic Korean Dictionary

References 

1999 non-fiction books
Korean language
Korean dictionaries
Online dictionaries
Standards of South Korea